The following is a list of awards and nominations received by British-American actress Tracey Ullman. She is the recipient of numerous accolades for her work in television, film, music, and theater. To date, Ullman has won twelve American Comedy Awards, seven Primetime Emmy Awards, two British Academy Film Awards, four Satellite Awards, a Golden Globe Award, and a Screen Actors Guild Award.

On 5 December 2006, she was honoured at the Museum of Television and Radio along with the likes of Carol Burnett, Lesley Visser, Lesley Stahl, Jane Pauley, and Betty White, in the "She Made It" category.

In April 2009, it was announced that Ullman would be awarded a Lifetime Achievement BAFTA Award the following May. She became the first recipient of the Charlie Chaplin Lifetime Achievement Award for Comedy on 9 May 2009.

Television and film

American Comedy Awards

British Academy of Film and Television Arts (BAFTA)
The British Academy Film Awards are presented by the British Academy of Film and Television Arts.

Banff World Media Festival

Boston Society of Film Critics Awards

CableACE Award

Critics' Choice Television Award

Detroit Film Critics Society

Gold Derby|Gold Derby Awards

Golden Globe Awards
The Golden Globe Awards are presented by the Hollywood Foreign Press Association.

National Board of Review

Online Film & Television Association

Phoenix Film Critics Society Awards

Primetime Emmy Awards
The Emmy Awards are presented by the American Academy of Television Arts & Sciences.

Satellite Awards

Screen Actors Guild Awards
The Screen Actors Guild Awards (SAG Awards) are presented by the Screen Actors Guild-American Federation of Television and Radio Artists (SAG-AFTRA).

Washington DC Area Film Critics Association Awards

Writers Guild of America Awards

Theatre

Drama Desk Awards
The Drama Desk Awards are presented by the Drama Desk Organisation.

Evening Standard Theatre Awards

London Critics' Circle Awards

Theatre World Awards

Music

Brit Awards

Honorary

References

External links

 
 

Awards
Lists of awards received by British actor
Lists of awards received by American actor